Fuller Hill is a mountain located in the Catskill Mountains of New York northwest of Roscoe. Morton Hill is located east-southeast of Fuller Hill and Baxter Mountain is located west-southwest.

References

Mountains of Delaware County, New York
Mountains of New York (state)